Porta del Sol is a tourism region in western Puerto Rico. It consists of 17 municipalities in the western area: Quebradillas, Isabela, San Sebastián, Moca, Aguadilla, Aguada, Rincón, Añasco, Mayagüez, Las Marías, Maricao, Hormigueros, San Germán, Sábana Grande, Guánica, Lajas and Cabo Rojo.  Porta del Sol was established in 2003 by the Puerto Rico Tourism Company. The name translates to "Doorway to the Sun"

Two major airports with commercial service connect the area to other cities in Puerto Rico and the world, these being Rafael Hernandez Airport in Aguadilla with services on five passenger airlines as well as some cargo airlines, and Eugenio Maria de Hostos Airport in Mayagüez, with domestic flights to San Juan on one airline.

Attractions
Biobay, La Parguera 
Boqueron Beach, Cabo Rojo
Desecheo Island, Mayagüez 
Domes Beach, Rincón 
Palacete Los Moreau
Guajataca Lake
Club Deportivo del Oeste
Guajataca Tunnel
Guánica Dry Forest, Guánica
Guilligan's Island
Los Morillos Lighthouse, Cabo Rojo 
Mayagüez Zoo 
Porta Coeli - Religious Museum 
Rincon Lighthouse 
Salt Flats and Lighthouse Area, Cabo Rojo (El Combate)

See also

 National Register of Historic Places listings in Porta del Sol
 Beaches of Porta de Sol

References

External links

Tourism in Puerto Rico
Tourism regions